Dogliola is a village and comune in the province of Chieti in Abruzzo, Italy,  from Vasto, at an elevation of 445 m above sea level, overlooking the river Trigno valley.

References

Cities and towns in Abruzzo